Ladies Must Play is a 1930 pre-Code comedy film starring Dorothy Sebastian and Neil Hamilton directed by Raymond Cannon. Tony, a popular but bankrupt New York socialite, sends his stenographer to Newport to find and marry a millionaire, but she owes her boss a 10% commission.

Cast
 Dorothy Sebastian as Norma Blake
 Neil Hamilton as Anthony 'Tony' Gregg
 Natalie Moorhead as Connie Tremaine
 John Holland as Geoffrey West
 Harry Stubbs as Stormfield 'Stormy' Buttons
 Shirley Palmer as Marie
 Pauline Neff as Mrs. Wheeler

References

External links 
 

1930 films
American comedy films
1930 comedy films
1930s English-language films
Columbia Pictures films
American black-and-white films
FIlms directed by Raymond Cannon (actor)
1930s American films